Wedza (or Hwedza) is a district in the province of Mashonaland East, Zimbabwe. The area was sparsely inhabited by the Mbire people of the Soko Clan as early inhabitants who mined iron in the Hwedza hills during the 9th-12th centuries which means "a place of wealth". A village of Wedza was established in 1910 by Colonial administration. Gold, beryl, nickel, tungsten and grayite were mined in the hills around the village but deposits were too small to make further commercial mining viable.

Etymology
The word Wedza literally translates to "the lighting of the sun", or "twilight", and myth has it that the word is derived from the location of the ancient town, which was found on the other side of a deep forest. Pre-Colonial era Wedza was called Mbire. It was a very important area because of  the iron which was mined in the Wedza mountain. The iron was important for both wealth and ceremonial purposes. The iron was fashioned into hoes, axes and other farming implements which people especially young man in need of a wife required. A hoe especially was central part of the marriage ceremony. A young man could not obtain a wife if he could not present his future mother-in-law with one during the roora ceremony.

Geography
Hwedza is under chief Svosve and Chief Ruzane is well connected to other towns by tarred roads. Rusunzwe and Gandamasungo, the famous Wedza mountain range, are some of the most outstanding geographical features in Wedza. Hwedza District boundaries are the Save River on the west and Ruzave (Ruzawi) river on the east. Other rivers include Nyamidzi, Mhare, Nyamhembe and Chineyi. Hwedza is climatically divided into two halves, upper Hwedza from St Barnabas Chisasike to Hwedza center onwards which is cooler and has average to high rainfall; and lower Hwedza which is from Mukamba through Goneso and Zviyambe East and West small scale farming area (formerly known as purchase areas) which experiences warmer to hot temperatures and lower rainfall. Even the crops grown in the two parts differ significantly, cotton and sorghum/millet do better in lower Hwedza, while in upper Hwedza the same crops would not yield much.

Hwedza is also known for mazhanje/mashuku (a wild fruit harvested between late October into early December).

Services and transportation
Wedza is accessible by road from Harare but the roads have depreciated in quality as a result of the 'Land Reform Policy' which saw industry severely disrupted. Bus companies have stopped services the remote parts such as the areas of Chigondo, St Leoba, and Zana Resettlement. However, daily services are run by several minibus operators to the city of Harare and Marondera, usually terminating at Murambinda.

The service centre (growth point) consists of a Spar supermarket, a post office, a filling station, several drinking places and is served by reliable bus services by Chawasarira, Manica, Matemba, Mushandira/Matemai as well as several minibus operators. An airstrip capable of landing small aircraft is also present.

There is a clinic as well as a Hospital at Mt St Marys. Hwedza is also on the national electricity grid. The main crop grown is maize for both subsistence and sale.

Economy
The core business of Wedza was farming with its aligned service industries until disruptions to commercial agriculture and ranching in the area. Land Reform Project' 2000 of Zimbabwe saw white  Zimbabwean farmers who inherited land from their colonial forefathers  who had originally and often violently taken it from the local people driving them into the Lower Wedza villages, being driven off the farms to a fate undetermined that in turn meant vast amounts of locally employed people lost jobs and livelihoods.

Agriculture
Wedza's unique location offers a vast array of agricultural opportunity. Areas along Watershed Road leading into Wedza from Harare were known for tobacco, maize and paprika production during the warm wet season (October to March). The more southerly part of the district encompassing areas of Makarara, Zviyambe and leading into Dorowa were once a bastion of cotton farming and cattle ranching before 2000. The more central part of the district has a history of erratic rain and as such, villages located in this part of the district are often in need of food aid as they often fail to reap meaningful harvests with the unpredictable rainfall patterns.
 Currently tobacco is the most dominant field crop grown, followed by groundnuts which is grown in every homestead especially in Zviyambe area. The tobacco production has expanded significantly in Zviyambe and resettlement areas giving an average output of 1300 kg / ha. The 2013 tobacco selling season has showed that most farmers have improved in terms of output and quality.

Politics
Upper Wedza which mainly consists of commercial farms, good rainfall, a Hospital and at least 3 good boarding schools namely Chemhanza, Mt St Marys Rusunzwe and St Annes Goto : The area was seized from the Mbire people by the original white settler farmers most of whom had been gold panners and fortune hunters tricked by Cecil John Rhodes and Rudd into settling as farmers under the promise of finding gold. Failing to find the gold they had been promised they were encouraged to take whatever land they needed in what areas suited them and become farmers. Through this exercise they drove away the local Mbire people into villages in lower Wedza where the rain is erratic and the soil significantly poor. Through this exercise many were driven off their ancestral lands living behind family shrines and graves through the Tribal Trust lands Act. The first Chimurenga which was won by the Rhodesian forces paved way to this exercise.
The Second Chimurenga and its aftermath has for years inclined the popular vote from the district towards ZANU PF. However, despite the socio-economic challenges Wedza has continued to be a stronghold of ZANU-PF.

Education
Notable schools from the Wedza area are St Annes Goto (Anglican), Mt St Marys (Catholic), Chemhanza (Methodist) and Hwedza High School (government). Other institutions include Matsine, Chigwedere, Gumbonzvanda, St Margaret's Chigondo, Nhumwa, St Leoba's, Holy Spirit Ruzane, St Anderson Mutiweshiri, Makanda, Barnabas, St Augustine Chitida and Rambanapasito name but a few.

Several schools are found within the district:
 Primary Schools
St Johns Maninga Primary School
St Barnabas Primary School
Chimimba Primary School
chinyonga primary school
makurumure primary school
St Thomas Aquinas Primary School
 St Margaret's Chigondo Primary School
 St Matthias Ruswa Primary School
 St Joseph's Primary School
 Gumbonzvanda Primary School
St Pauls Primary School
St Stephen's Makurumure primary school
St John's Matsvai Primary School
 Chemhanza Primary School
 Mt St Mary's (Rusunzwe) Primary School
 Payarira Primary School
 Sengezi Primary School
 Magamba Primary School
 Mukondwa Primary School
 Gandamasungo Primary School
 Rambanapasi Primary School
St Johns Matsvai Primary School
 Mutupwizana Primary School
 Holy Spirit Ruzane School
 St Mark's Goneso Primary School
 St Mark's Musavadye Primary School
 St Augustine Chitida
 Secondary Schools
St Barnabas (Madzimbabwe) Secondary School
St Mathias Ruswa Secondary School
 Wedza High School
 Mt St Mary's High School
St Augustine Chitida
 Saint Thomas Aquinas Secondary
 Mukondwa Secondary School
 St Annes Goto High School
 Chemhanza High School
 Zana Secondary School
 Rambanapasi Secondary School
 Magamba Secondary School
 Matsine Secondary School
 Holy Spirit Ruzane School
 St Mary's Makanda Secondary School
 Gumbonzvanda High School
St Pauls Sango Secondary School

Tourism
The location of Imire Game Park within the district makes it a somehow good location for a safari trip. The game park has for years taken part in the Rhinoceros breeding programme. However of late poachers have killed several of the animals including breeding cows.

Notable People
Constantino Chiwenga
 
Tinashe Mutarisi

Famous residents
Several people of prominence in civil society and government have emerged from Wedza.
 General Constantino Chiwenga - Zimbabwe 1st Vice President
 George Tawengwa - Nationalist,  Businessman
 Paul Tangi Mhova Mkondo - Nationalist, part of the first group of Gonakudzingwa restriction camp political prisoners, Pioneer Indigenous Businessman & Entrepreneur, Pioneer Indigenous Commercial Farmer, Philanthropist and Conservationist.
 Sunday Chidzambwa - former Warriors coach, Zifa Chairman

References

 Macdonald, S. (compiler), 2003. Winter Cricket : The Spirit of Wedza; a collection of biographies, articles, memories and recollections; Harare, Zimbabwe : Conlon Printers  

 
Districts of Mashonaland East Province